Ahmad Zia Massoud (born May 1, 1956) is an Afghan politician who was the Vice President of Afghanistan in the first elected administration of President Hamid Karzai, from December 2004 to November 2009. He is a younger brother of the late Ahmad Shah Massoud, the resistance leader against the Soviet invasion of Afghanistan and against the Taliban. In late 2011, Ahmad Zia Massoud joined hands with major leaders in the National Front of Afghanistan, which strongly opposed a return of the Taliban to power. The National Front was generally regarded as a reformation of the United Front (Northern Alliance) which with U.S. air support temporarily removed the Taliban from power in late 2001.

Biography
Ahmad Zia Massoud was born on May 1, 1956, in Muqur, which is in the Ghazni province of Afghanistan. He attended the Lycée Esteqlal in Kabul. In 1976, he was admitted to the Polytechnical University of Kabul where he studied for three years. Caught up in the tumultuous events in the country after the communist Saur Revolution he left the university and joined the mujahideen led by his brother Ahmad Shah Massoud in the Panjshir Valley north of Kabul.

From 1978 to 1981, Ahmad Zia directed the resistance forces of Paryan in Haut-Panjsher. Between 1981 and April 1992, his commander and brother Ahmed Shah Massoud named him special representative of the Jamiat-e-Islami party to Peshawar, Pakistan, where the seven principal parties of the Afghan resistance met. During this period he maintained and increased contacts with political leaders of all the Afghan resistance movement, including diplomatic circles and international organizations. He also traveled abroad to make the case for the mujahideen.

After the fall of the Soviet-backed communist regime, Burhanuddin Rabbani, his father-in-law, chose him to be an advisor and special representative of the Islamic State of Afghanistan. The Taliban eventually took power in Kabul and established the Islamic Emirate of Afghanistan. Ahmad Zia Massoud joined the anti-Taliban United Islamic Front led by his brother Ahmad Shah Massoud. In the late 1990s, Ahmad Zia Massoud continued his political and diplomatic activities, working to raise the profile of Afghanistan on the international stage, and to call attention to the horrors of the Taliban.

In December 2001, after the fall of the Taliban regime, President Hamid Karzai named him ambassador to the Russian Federation under Vladimir Putin. In February 2004 Ahmad Zia's functions were extended to include the Republic of Armenia, and then in July of that year, Belarus, and Moldova as well. He is the First Deputy of Zalmai Rassoul in Afghanistan Presidential elections of 2014.

On July 26, 2004, Karzai announced that he had chosen Ahmad Zia Massoud as his running mate over Defense Minister Mohammad Qasim Fahim in the October 9, 2004 presidential elections. While campaigning in the 2004 elections a bomb was detonated at a political rally of Massoud in the northern Afghan city of Feyzabad. Two people were killed but Massoud emerged unscathed.

After several political disputes between Ahmad Zia Massoud and Hamid Karzai, the two men parted ways. In the 2009 presidential elections Karzai ran on an election ticket with Mohammad Qasim Fahim instead. In December 2009 another bomb blast is believed to have targeted Ahmad Zia Massoud. He emerged unharmed while 8 people were killed and 40 wounded.

National Front of Afghanistan

In late 2011, Ahmad Zia Massoud united major political anti-Taliban leaders in the National Front of Afghanistan, which strongly opposes a return of the Taliban to power. The National Front retains significant military capabilities.

U.S. Congressman Louie Gohmert wrote, "These leaders who fought with embedded Special Forces to initially defeat the Taliban represent over 60-percent of the Afghan people, yet are being entirely disregarded by the Obama and Karzai Administrations in negotiations."

In January 2012, Ahmad Zia Massoud, Abdul Rashid Dostum, leader of the Uzbek-dominated Junbish-i Milli, Haji Mohammad Mohaqiq, one leader of the Hazara Shia Hezb-e Wahdat, and Amrullah Saleh, former director of the Afghan intelligence service NDS and leader of the Basij-e Milli, came together in a meeting with US congressmen in Berlin and signed a joint declaration:

The Asia Times writes: "This is the first time that the leadership of the Tajik, Uzbek and Hazara communities [of Afghanistan] has come to a common line of thinking ... In essence, the Northern Alliance is being resuscitated as a political entity. ... As the Northern Alliance groups see it, Pakistani strategy is to wait out the period between now and 2014 - the date set for the US troop withdrawal - and then regroup the Taliban and make a bid to capture power in Kabul. Their strong show of unity in Berlin suggests that they will not roll over and give way to an exclusive US-Taliban-Pakistan settlement being imposed on their nation."

2014 Presidential Elections
In the 2014 Presidential elections Ahmad Zia Massoud ran with then Foreign Minister Dr. Zalmai Rassoul in the 2014 Afghan presidential election. 
During the second round of the election he endorsed candidate Dr. Ashraf Ghani Ahmadzai. Publicly they had signed an agreement that Ahmad Zia Massoud would hold the position of chief executive officer under Ghani's administration. However, with the difficulties during the second round of the election between the two presidential candidates Dr. Ashraf Ghani Ahmadzai and Dr. Abdullah Abdullah, Ahmad Zia Massoud stepped aside leaving the position of chief executive officer to Dr. Abdullah Abdullah who had demanded the same position after losing the race. 
Currently Ahmad Zia Massoud holds the position of The Special Representative of the President of Afghanistan in Reform and Good Governance.

Personal life 
Ahmad Zia Massoud is married to a daughter of Burhanuddin Rabbani. They have four children.

See also 
Ahmad Shah Massoud
National Front of Afghanistan
Christian H. Cooper
Amrullah Saleh
Haji Mohammad Mohaqiq
Abdullah Abdullah
Abdul Rashid Dostum
Ajmal selab
hasib qoway markaz
Ustad Atta Mohammad Noor
Politics of Afghanistan
List of leaders of Afghanistan

External links
Official Facebook presence of Ahmad Zia Massoud

 
Yahya Massoud (brother of Ahmad Zia Massoud) / Djeyhoun Ostowar (Jan 12, 2012): Perspectives and prospects of negotiating with the Taliban
Asia Times (Jan 12, 2012): There's more to peace than Taliban

References 

Vice presidents of Afghanistan
1956 births
Living people
Afghan anti-communists
Afghan Sunni Muslims
Afghan Tajik people
Politicians of Ghazni Province
Jamiat-e Islami politicians
Ambassadors of Afghanistan to Russia
Ambassadors of Afghanistan to Armenia
Ambassadors of Afghanistan to Belarus
Ambassadors of Afghanistan to Moldova
Afghan diplomats